Paul Anka is the 1958 debut album by Canadian singer Paul Anka. It was released by ABC Paramount, and features Anka's hit single, "Diana".

Track listing

References

1958 debut albums
Paul Anka albums
ABC Records albums